Back Benches was a New Zealand political interview show, presented by Wallace Chapman and Damian Christie. It was primarily filmed at the Backbencher pub, across the street from Parliament Buildings in Wellington.

The show was cancelled on TVNZ 7 in July 2012 when the station was shut down, being replaced with TV ONE +1, a timeshift of TV ONE. The final three episodes were filmed at the Shepherd's Arms Hotel after an after-hours kitchen fire at the Backbencher pub rendered it unusable.

In August 2012, Prime TV expressed interest in reviving the series with a similar format. On 13 September 2012, it was confirmed that Prime would be bringing the show back in February 2013 by one of the show's hosts, Wallace Chapman. On 27 March 2013, the start date for the new series was confirmed as 10 April 2013 by Wallace Chapman and Damian Christie.

On 28 September 2017, it was announced by the producer Caroline Brunner on Twitter that Back Benches had aired its final show. The public agency that funds media, New Zealand On Air, did not renew funding for Back Benches.

Format 
Each episode a panel of about three to five people are present on the show. The panel members are usually sitting MPs There is usually one from each of the National and Labour parties, and one from each of two other parties with seats (that is, Green, Māori, Mana, ACT, United Future and New Zealand First, parties).

There is also a summary of political news during the preceding week (from both New Zealand and internationally), a small (10 person) poll of a current issue or controversy, and a 'Who am I?' game where customers present at the pub can guess which sitting MP clues read out are about.

See also 
 Politics of New Zealand
 Parliament of New Zealand

External links

References

2000s New Zealand television series
2010s New Zealand television series
2008 New Zealand television series debuts
2012 New Zealand television series endings
2013 New Zealand television series debuts
2017 New Zealand television series endings
New Zealand television news shows
Television shows funded by NZ on Air
Television shows set in Wellington
TVNZ 7 original programming
Prime (New Zealand TV channel) original programming